The America Zone was one of the three regional zones of the 1966 Davis Cup.

6 teams entered the America Zone, with the winner going on to compete in the Inter-Zonal Zone against the winners of the Eastern Zone and Europe Zone. The United States defeated Mexico in the final and progressed to the Inter-Zonal Zone.

Draw

Quarterfinals

Argentina vs. Chile

Venezuela vs. Caribbean/West Indies

Semifinals

Mexico vs. Argentina

Caribbean/West Indies vs. United States

Final

United States vs. Mexico

References

External links
Davis Cup official website

Davis Cup Americas Zone
America Zone
Davis Cup